Beth Shalom (lit. "House of Peace"), also named the National Holocaust Centre and Museum, is a Holocaust memorial centre near Laxton in Nottinghamshire in England. Opened in 1995, it is England's only dedicated Holocaust museum, though there is also a permanent exhibition at London's Imperial War Museum and another in Huddersfield, the Holocaust Exhibition and Learning Centre, which was opened in 2018. The centre was founded by brothers James and Stephen Smith following a 1991 visit to Israel during which a trip to Yad Vashem changed the way they looked at history and the Holocaust.

The museum seeks to educate primary school children about the Holocaust through its primary exhibit on children's experiences, funded in part by a lottery grant of nearly £500,000. Prince Harry was educated about the Holocaust at the Centre after he was criticised for wearing a Nazi armband as part of an Afrika Korps costume to a fancy dress party.

On 21 July 2010, almost twenty years after the Beth Shalom Holocaust Centre was founded, James and Stephen Smith and their mother Marina were each awarded honorary degrees of Doctor of Letters (DLitt) by Nottingham Trent University.

See also 
 Hyde Park Holocaust Memorial, unveiled in 1983 
 The Holocaust Exhibition and Learning Centre, Huddersfield
 The Wiener Library for the Study of the Holocaust and Genocide (London)
 Imperial War Museum
 List of Holocaust memorials and museums

References

External links
The National Holocaust Centre Museum

Jewish museums in the United Kingdom
Holocaust museums
Museums in Nottinghamshire
The Holocaust and the United Kingdom
1995 establishments in England
Museums established in 1995